Good Bye is Cali Gari's last album before their hiatus and return.  It was composed of hard to find indies era songs, along with two new tracks.

Track listing
Good Bye – 3:41
-187- – 1:24
Kimi ga Saku Yama – 4:43
Fura Fura Skip – 4:17
Shitasaki 3-Pun Size – 3:04
3.2.1.0. – 3:03
Kuso Carnival – 6:56
Erotopia – 5:49
Maguro – 4:43
Haikara•Setsubatsu•Haiso•Zessan – 4:30
Mahoraba Blues – 3:38
Siren – 4:39
Jelly – 2:54
Tsumetai Ame – 6:29
Seishun Kyousoukyoku – 4:17
Blue Film – 5:28
Itsuka, Dokoka de. – 6:42

Personnel
Shuuji Ishii – vocals
Ao Sakurai – guitar
Kenjirou Murai – bass
Makoto Takei – drums

References

Cali Gari albums
2003 albums